The Canton of Bruz is a canton of France, in the Ille-et-Vilaine département. At the French canton reorganisation which came into effect in March 2015, the canton was reduced from 7 to 5 communes:
Bruz 
Chartres-de-Bretagne
Laillé
Noyal-Châtillon-sur-Seiche
Pont-Péan

References

Cantons of Ille-et-Vilaine